Presidential elections were held in Gabon on 9 November 1986. The country was a one-party state at the time, with the Gabonese Democratic Party as the sole legal party. GDP leader and incumbent president Omar Bongo was the only candidate, and was re-elected unopposed. Voter turnout was reported to be 99.9%.

These were the last one-party elections in Gabon, as the country returned to multi-party democracy in 1990.

Results

References

1986 in Gabon
Gabon
Presidential elections in Gabon
One-party elections
Single-candidate elections